Infierno en el Ring (2013) (Spanish for "Inferno in the Ring") was a major professional wrestling event produced by Consejo Mundial de Lucha Libre (CMLL), which took place on July 19, 2013 in Arena México, Mexico City, Mexico. The 2013 Infierno en el Ring replaced CMLL's regularly scheduled Friday night Super Viernes show. The 2013 Infierno en el Ring was the fifth show promoted under that name, the 15th time CMLL have promoted an Infierno en el Ring cage match as part of their events. The main event of the show was the eponymous Infierno en el Ring match that CMLL traditionally has traditionally held approximately once a year. The Infierno en el Ring match is a multi-person Steel Cage match contested under Lucha de Apuestas, or bet match, rules which means that the loser of the match would be forced to unmask or have their hair shaved off per Lucha Libre traditions. At the 2013 event 10 wrestlers participated, all unmasked, making it one of the few Infierno en el Ring matches to only have wrestlers risk their hair on the outcome of the match. The participants included Averno, Blue Panther, Brazo de Plata, Máximo, Mr. Águila, Negro Casas, Rey Bucanero, Rey Escorpión, Rush and Shocker. In the end Shocker pinned Mr. Águila to win the match.

Production

Background
The Mexican wrestling company Consejo Mundial de Lucha Libre (Spanish for "World Wrestling Council"; CMLL) has held a number of major shows over the years using the moniker Infierno en el Ring ("Inferno in the Ring"), all of which were main evented by a multi-man steel cage match, the eponymous Infierno en el Ring match. CMLL has use the Infierno en el Ring match on other shows, but will intermittently hold a show billed specifically as Infierno en el Ring, with the first such show held in 2008. It is not an annually recurring show, but instead held intermittently sometimes several years apart and not always in the same month of the year either. All Infierno en el Ring shows have been held in Arena México in Mexico City, Mexico which is CMLL's main venue, its "home". Traditionally CMLL holds their major events on Friday Nights, which means the Infierno en el Ring  shows replace their regularly scheduled Super Viernes show. The 2013 Infierno en el Ring show was the fifth show to use the name.

Storylines
The event featured six professional wrestling matches with different wrestlers involved in pre-existing scripted feuds, plots and storylines. Wrestlers were portrayed as either heels (referred to as rudos in Mexico, those that portray the "bad guys") or faces (técnicos'' in Mexico, the "good guy" characters) as they followed a series of tension-building events, which culminated in a wrestling match or series of matches.

Results

Order of elimination

References

2013 in professional wrestling
CMLL Infierno en el Ring
Events in Mexico City
July 2013 events in Mexico
2013 in Mexico